The Poverello Center, Inc. is a 501(c)(3) organization devoted to advocating for and providing a multitude of services to address and improve the health, well-being and stability of the homeless and under-served within Missoula, Montana.

History
On March 18, 1974, four women met at the Knights of Columbus Hall to cook nourishing bread, soup, and coffee for the homeless. For the first several years, the Poverello was run by nuns, though it has since become a secular non-profit.

Until 1979, the soup kitchen seemed an adequate service. That winter Patrick Todd, Director of the Poverello Center, wrote of the increasing need to shelter people "alone in the night with no place to go." He wrote the poignant story of Humberto Roca, a man of Mexican descent who understood little English. He was on his way to visit his sister but ended up in Missoula, MT. His difficulty in walking made it apparent that he was suffering from frostbite. A subsequent visit to the local hospital resulted in amputation. The incident fueled Todd's crusade to fill the need for emergency housing. The Poverello Center emergency shelter was opened on November 18, 1981. Over the course of the last thirty years, the Poverello Center has continued to identify and meet the needs of people living in poverty in its community.

The word "poverello" is an Italian word denoting "the poor one," originally in reference to St. Francis of Assisi.

Programs & Services
The Poverello Center, Inc. operates three separate programs addressing the diverse needs of the Missoula community. In its Ryman Street emergency shelter, the "Pov" is at capacity sleeping approximately 75 homeless residents a night but regularly serves up to 118 people in need of shelter during the winter months. The emergency shelter is a dry facility, meaning residents must be sober in order to access night services. Clients who access the soup kitchen, food pantry, laundry and shower services during daytime hours may be able to do so under the influence barring any behavioral issues. The shelter also works in conjunction with Partnership Health Center to offer a free health clinic to the homeless community

Through its "Food Insecurities Program," The Poverello Center serves over 100,000 hot meals a year at its emergency shelter. A continental breakfast is served from 4am to 7:30am daily. A hot lunch and dinner is also served every day. Meals are also served on all major holidays. In addition to the soup kitchen, the shelter also offers a food pantry, grocery rescue program and sack lunch program, feeding thousands of hungry, homeless and low income individuals and families each year.

Clients are homeless and/or working poor individuals, some of whom are disabled, mentally ill, elderly and/or veterans. Some clients also struggle with substance abuse recovery. In order to access services, clients must be over the age of 18.

The Ryman Street facility also offers a "Breaking Barriers Program," which provides clients the opportunity to meet with a Referral Specialist who works in conjunction with other local organizations to provide case management, mental health evaluations, drug & alcohol treatment and a variety of other services to assist those in need. Direct Care Staff at the Poverello Center also offer supportive services to homeless and impoverished individuals and families 24 hours a day, including bus passes, mail pick-up, obtainment of identification, birth certificates, job and housing placement, local and long-distance calls and more.

The Poverello Center also administers the Veteran's Administration’s regional Homeless Veterans Program. Individuals who qualify for this service are offered benefits for enrolling.

Operating in downtown Missoula, the Homeless Outreach Team seeks to serve and engage the homeless within the wider Missoula community. It provides opportunities for community education on homelessness and constructive approaches for residential and organizational interactions with homeless men and women. Run by coordinator Travis Mateer and a rotating team of volunteers, the shelter's H.O.T. also helps distribute toiletries, food and clothing to those who do not regularly seek the shelter's services.

The Valor House program provides transitional housing and supportive services for up to 17 homeless veterans, both men and women. Residents are able to remain in the program for up to two years while addressing the necessary steps and goals allowing veterans to secure stable, long-term housing.

Board of Directors & Staff
The Poverello Center consists of a Board of Directors with 13 members of the community. The organization's Executive Director, Eran Fowler-Pehan oversees all three programs.

Statistics
Since 1982, over 450,000 shelter nights have been provided to men and women in need of emergency housing. While the first years of providing shelter averaged 5,000 shelter nights a year, the need has grown by over 430% to the rate of 25,763 shelter nights in 2012. In the 39 years the Poverello Center has provided meals to Missoulians in need, over 2.5 million meals have been served − equivalent to 66,000 meals a year. Nearly 25% of all meals provided were in the last six years.

Along with providing emergency shelter and hot meals to the community of Missoula, the Poverello Center has operated a food pantry since 1982 to further assist households in need. Nearly 140,000 food pantry requests have been fulfilled in the past 31 years.

Help Build Hope Campaign
After decades in an old boarding house in downtown Missoula, the Poverello Center's emergency shelter began their Help Build Hope Campaign to fund the building of a new site for its growing clientele. The recent economic downturn has put new stresses on many of the shelter's neighbors and businesses. When the boarding house on Ryman Street became the Poverello Center in 1981, 4,800 nights of shelter and 15,000 meals were provided yearly. Last year, in essentially the same facility, they provided more than 25,000 nights of shelter and served nearly 140,000 meals. Consequently, the organization is in the process of building a new facility.

Ground broke in October 2013 and the new location was open in December, 2014 at 1110 W. Broadway.

Notes

Organizations based in Missoula, Montana
Homeless shelters in the United States
Non-profit organizations based in Montana
Buildings and structures in Missoula, Montana
1974 establishments in Montana
Organizations established in 1974